Thammavaram is a village situated in East Godavari district in Kakinada, in Andhra Pradesh State, India.

References

Villages in East Godavari district